Raymond Uytterhaeghe (born 25 October 1947) is a French wrestler. He competed in two events at the 1968 Summer Olympics.

References

External links
 

1947 births
Living people
French male sport wrestlers
Olympic wrestlers of France
Wrestlers at the 1968 Summer Olympics
Sportspeople from Nord (French department)